Iolaus calisto, the large green sapphire, is a butterfly in the family Lycaenidae. It is found in Senegal, Gambia, Guinea-Bissau, Guinea, southern Burkina Faso, Sierra Leone, Ivory Coast, Ghana, Togo, Nigeria (south and the Cross River loop), Cameroon, Gabon and the Central African Republic. The habitat consists of forests.

References

External links

Die Gross-Schmetterlinge der Erde 13: Die Afrikanischen Tagfalter. Plate XIII 67 e

Butterflies described in 1851
Iolaus (butterfly)